A record chart, in the music industry, also called a music chart, is a ranking of recorded music according to certain criteria during a given period. Many different criteria are used in worldwide charts, often in combination. These include record sales, the amount of radio airplay, the number of downloads, and the amount of streaming activity.

Some charts are specific to a particular musical genre and most to a particular geographical location. The most common period covered by a chart is one week with the chart being printed or broadcast at the end of this time. Summary charts for years and decades are then calculated from their component weekly charts. Component charts have become an increasingly important way to measure the commercial success of individual songs.

A common format of radio and television programmes is to run down a music chart.

Chart hit
A chart hit is a recording, identified by its inclusion in a chart that uses sales or other criteria to rank popular releases, that ranks highly in popularity compared to other songs in the same time frame. Chart-topper and related terms (like number one, No. 1 hit, top of the charts, chart hit, and so forth) are widely used in common conversation and in marketing, and are loosely defined. Because of its value in promoting recording artists and releases, both directly to the consumer, and by encouraging exposure on radio, TV other media, chart positioning has long been a subject of scrutiny and controversy. Chart compilation methodology and data sources vary, ranging from "buzz charts" (based on opinions of various experts and tastemakers), to charts that reflect empirical data such as retail sales. Therefore, a chart-topper may be anything from an "insiders' pick" to a runaway seller. Most charts that are used to determine extant mainstream popularity rely on measurable data.

Record chart performance is inherently relative, as they rank songs, albums and records in comparison to each other at the same time, as opposed to music recording sales certification methods, which are measured in absolute numbers. Comparing the chart positions of songs at different times thus does not provide an accurate comparison of a song's overall impact. The nature of most charts, particularly weekly charts, also favors songs that sell very well for a brief period; thus, a song that is only briefly popular may chart higher than a song that sells more copies in the long range, but more slowly. As a result, a band's biggest hit single may not be its best-selling single.

According to Joel Whitburn, the American trade publication Billboard introduced the Hot 100 on August 4, 1958.  This was the first chart in the US to "fully integrate the hottest-selling and most-played pop singles."  From 1958 until 1991, Billboard compiled the chart from playlists reported by radio stations, and surveys of retail sales outlets.  Before 1958, several charts were published, including "Best Sellers in Stores", "Most Played by Jockeys" (later revived under the name Hot 100 Airplay), and "Most Played in Juke Boxes", and, in later collations of chart hits, the record's highest placing in any of those charts was usually reported.  On November 30, 1991, Billboard introduced a new method of determining the Hot 100, "by a combination of actual radio airplay monitored electronically by Nielsen Broadcast Data Systems (BDS), additional playlists from small-market stations, and actual point-of-sale information provided by Nielsen SoundScan."  Until 1998, any songs placed on the chart had to be physically available as a single. The Hot 100 continues to be published.

Terminologies
There are several commonly used terms when referring to a music/entertainment chart or the performance of a release thereon.

A new entry is a title which is making its début in that chart. This is applied to all charts, for instance a track which is outside the Top 40 but which later climbs into that level of the chart is considered to be a 'new entry' to the Top 40 that week. In most official charts, tracks have to have been on sale for a period of time in order to enter the charts; however, in some retailers' charts, new releases are included in charts as 'new entries' without a sales history in order to make them more visible to purchasers. A real new entry is a title that makes its chart début, no matter how many positions officially the chart actually is. In the UK, the official published chart is a Top 100, although a new entry can take place between positions 101-200 (this is also true of the Billboard Hot 100, which has a "bubbling under" addendum for new songs that have not yet made the Hot 100). The Top 40 is only used for radio to shorten the play-lists.

A re-entry is a track which has previously entered a chart and fallen out of that chart, and then later re-appears in it. This may come about if a release is reissued or if there is a surge of interest in the track. Generally, any repeat entry of a track into a chart is considered a re-entry, unless the later version of the track is a materially different recording or is significantly repackaged (such as Michael Jackson's "Thriller 25"), where the release would normally be considered separate and thus a "new" entry.

A climber is a release which is going higher in the chart week-on-week. Because chart positions are generally relative to each other on a week-to-week basis, a release does not necessarily have to increase sales week-to-week to be a climber, as if releases ahead of it decline in sales sufficiently, they may slip below it. By the same metric, not all week-to-week sales increases result in a climber, if other releases improve by a sufficient amount to keep it from climbing. The term highest climber is used to denote the release making the biggest leap upwards in the chart that week. There is generally not an equivalent phrase for tracks going down the chart; the term "faller" is occasionally used, but not as widely as 'climber'.

The top 10, top 20 and so forth are used to determine the relative success of a release. For instance, a track may be referred to as a 'top 10 hit' if it reaches a position between 1 and 10 on the singles chart, as a 'top 20 hit' if it reaches between positions 1 and 20, and so on. The most commonly known chart is the 'top 40', widely used by the media in various territories, though it is common for longer lists to be produced for or by the music industry. For example, in the UK, the Official Charts Company produces a top 200, although various media only publish shorter lists.

A one-hit wonder is an act that appears on the chart just once, or has one song that peaks exceptionally higher, or charts for exceptionally longer than other chart entries by the act. The term true one-hit wonder was the term given by the Guinness Book of British Hit Singles & Albums (and also the Billboard book Top Pop Singles) for an act that has one number one hit and nothing else on the chart ever. If an act appears in some other form (for example, a solo act that appears with a band or with other act) then these are taken separately.

See also

List of record charts

References

 
Popular music
Music industry